Goleba jocquei is a species of jumping spider in the genus Goleba. The species has been identified in the Republic of the Congo. The female was first described by Tamás Szűts in 2001 and is the first new species in the genus.

References

Endemic fauna of the Republic of the Congo
Salticidae
Spiders described in 2001
Spiders of Africa